Ludovic Boi (born 27 March 1989) is a Mauritian-Australian footballer who plays in the Football West State League for Floreat Athena.

Career
Boi began playing football in Mauritius for Racing Club before moving with his family to Australia in 2001.

Ludovic started out his professional career with Stirling Lions. After that, he signed on for the inaugural Perth Glory youth squad, featuring prominently. On 1 November 2009 he made his senior debut for Perth Glory as a substitute against Melbourne Victory. In 2010, he rejoined Stirling Lions.

A-League career statistics 
(Correct as of 20 April 2010)

Honours
Personal honours
 National Youth League Top Scorer: 2009-2010 with Perth Glory - 5 goals (tied with Glen Trifiro)

References

External links
 Perth Glory profile

Living people
1989 births
A-League Men players
Australian soccer players
Mauritian footballers
Mauritian expatriate footballers
Perth Glory FC players
National Premier Leagues players
Association football midfielders
Stirling Macedonia FC players